The Justice Project Inc. is a non-governmental organisation based in Melbourne, Australia. Its first project was to campaign for refugee policy reform and to campaign for human rights in Australia, and these remain their primary focus. Its members include Julian Burnside QC, the Right Honourable Malcolm Fraser, Associate Professor Robert Manne and Hugh Evans (Young Australian of the Year 2004).

Following The Justice Project's campaign in last year's Federal election, TJP decided to continue its campaign against mandatory detention, but also, in the next few months, to focus specifically on Victoria's decision to consider a Charter or Bill of Rights. The Justice Project supports the initiative of the Australian Capital Territory in enacting a Human Rights Act in 2004. TJP operates on the premise that this momentum should be continued to all Australian States and Territories, eventually culminating in a constitutionally enshrined Australian Charter of Rights.

See also
Innocence Project

References

Non-profit organisations based in Victoria (Australia)
Human rights organisations based in Australia